Maia Sørensen (born 11 August 2004) is a Danish figure skater. She is a two-time Danish national champion.

Sørensen has represented Denmark at three ISU Championships — the 2022 European Championships, 2019 World Junior Championships and 2020 World Junior Championships.

Personal life 
Sørensen was born on 11 August 2004 in Vancouver, British Columbia, Canada.

Career 
Sørensen began skating in 2009. In the summer of 2020, she changed training locations, moving from Denmark to Oberstdorf, Germany, where Michael Huth became her coach.

Programs

Results
CS: Challenger Series; JGP: Junior Grand Prix

References

External links

 

2004 births
Living people
Danish female single skaters
Figure skaters from Vancouver
Danish people of Canadian descent
21st-century Danish women